The Hospitals is the 2003 debut album by The Hospitals.

Track listing
All songs by Adam Stonehouse, except where stated.

Side one
"Song 1" 		
"Hazmat" 		
"Freer" 		
"Rock And Roll Is Killing My Life" (written by Alan Vega)
"I Say Go" 
Side two		
"Friends" 		
"I'm Invisible" 		
"Again And Again" 		
"Don't Panic" 		
"We Buzz Just Like Bees Do" 		
"Missing My Hands"

Personnel
Adam Stonehouse – vocals, drums
Rod Meyer – guitar

References

2003 albums
The Hospitals albums